Afro-Venezuelans (Spanish: Afrovenezolanos) are Venezuelans of African descent. About 4% of the Venezuelan population self-identify as "black" or "Afro-descendant", although most Venezuelans are mixed with African ancestry. Afro-Venezuelans are mostly descendants of enslaved Africans brought to the Western Hemisphere during the Atlantic slave trade. This term also sometimes refers to the combining of African and other cultural elements found in Venezuelan society such as the arts, traditions, music, religion, race, and language.

History

Slave Trade 
Between 1576 and 1810, about 100,000 African slaves were transported across the Atlantic to Venezuela via the transatlantic slave trade. These slaves belonged to various ethnicities from present-day Angola, Senegal, Gambia, Benin, Nigeria and the Congo, such as: Kalabari, Igbo, Yoruba, Kongo, Wolof, and more. Slaves were treated as units of commerce, referred to as pieza de india in reference to their physique and potential for travel. Throughout the sixteenth century, slaves were brought to toil in the gold mines in Coro and Buría (Yaracuy) and to Isla Margarita and Cumaná for fishing and pearl diving. Small-scale agricultural plantations were also initiated in Venezuela, especially among the regions surrounding Caracas. In the 18th century, immense shipments of slaves were transported to Barlovento to aid the burgeoning cacao industry, indigo plantations in the Venezuelan Llanos and the sugar plantations in Lara, Aragua and Zulia, around Lake Maracaibo.

Slave rebellions 
The history of slave revolts in Venezuela, both in the form of runaway communities and mutiny, began quite early. The first documented insurrection was in Coro on 1532. However, the most momentous revolt of the time took place on the Buría mines on 1552. The rebellion was led by El Negro Miguel (also known as Rey Miguel), who founded a Maroons, cimarrón, or cumbe (escaped slave) settlement and had himself proclaimed king. He developed an army of 1,500 slaves, Blacks, Mulattos, Zambos and Indigenous peoples to attack colonial establishments.

There were a number of rebellions of enslaved people throughout the history of the colony. "Cumbe" derives from the Manding term for "out-of-the-way place". Typically located above river banks or in remote mountainous areas, cumbes were usually well hidden and housed an average of 120 residents. Cimarrones were frequently aided by indigenous tribes living in the area (e.g., the Tomusa in Barlovento), and cumbe populations were composed not only of Blacks, but also of Indians and even of poor Whites. Cimarrón groups conducted raids on plantations, assisted in the escapes of other slaves, and participated in contraband trading. The only legally established town of free Blacks was that of Curiepe, established in Barlovento in 1721 under the leadership of Captain Juan del Rosario Blanco. The community was composed of former members of Caracas's Company of Free Blacks as well as huangos from the Antilles. The latter were escaped slaves who, like all Blacks fleeing non-Spanish-speaking islands, were granted freedom upon arrival in Venezuela if they accepted baptism.

Numbers of runaway-slave communities continued to increase throughout the seventeenth century, and by 1720 there were between 20,000 and 30,000 cimarrones in Venezuela, as opposed to the 60,000 slaves still working on the plantations (Rout 1976, 111112). Barlovento was the site of intense cimarrón activity throughout the eighteenth century, with several cumbe settlements being established around Caucagua and Curiepe. In 1732, there was an uprising of enslaved people led by Andresote in Puerto Cabello and Capaye. In 1747, Miguel Luengo led a rebellion of enslaved people in Yare.

There were many cumbes in the interior of what later became Venezuela. The most famous of these was that of Ocoyta, founded around 1770 by the legendary Guillermo Rivas. Guillermo ran away in 1768, and formed a cumbe which included runaways of African and Indian origin.

After he led raids on various plantations both to liberate slaves and to punish overseers, a special army was raised to destroy Ocoyta and execute Rivas. The cumbe of Ocoyta was eventually destroyed in 1771. A military expedition led by German de Aguilera destroyed the settlement, killing Guillermo, but only succeeded in capturing eight adults and two children. The rest of the runaways withdrew into the surrounding forests, where they remained at large.

One of Guillermo's deputies, Ubaldo the Englishman, whose christened name was Jose Eduardo de la Luz Perera, was initially born a slave in London, was sold to a ship captain, and took a number of trips before eventually being granted his freedom. He was one of a number of free black people who joined the community of Ocoyta. In 1772, he was captured by the Spanish authorities.

In 1794, there were uprisings in the Caucagua and Capaya districts. In 1795, an uprising led by Jose Leonardo Chirinos in the Sierras de Coro. In 1799, Lieutenant Francisco Javier Pirela led an uprising of the enslaved black militias.

Abolition of slavery 

Afro-Venezuelans played a crucial role in the struggle for independence. Originally, slaves fought for the Crown, believing that the landowning creole Republicans were their enemies. In particular, the notorious royalist battalion of General José Tomás Boves attracted many slave soldiers. Bolívar, realizing the strategic importance of Black soldiers in the fight for independence, declared the abolition of slavery in 1812 and again in 1816, after promising Haitian president Alexandre Pétion that he would secure freedom for slaves in return for Haitian military aid. A major landowner himself, Bolívar freed 1,000 of his own slaves, and in 1819 recruited 5,000 slaves into his army. Many members of cumbes fought on the side of the rebels, and abandoned their villages.

José Antonio Paéz, a key figure in Venezuelan independence, led an army of Blacks from the llanos (plains). One of his most famous lieutenants, Pedro Camejo, has been immortalized in Venezuelan history as "El Negro Primero", because he was always the first to ride into battle. In the final battle of Carabobo, Camejo was mortally wounded but returned to General Paéz to utter one of the most famous statements in Venezuelan history: "General, vengo decirle, adiós, porque estoy muerto" (General, I have come to say goodbye, because I am dead). A statue of El Negro Primero stands in the Plaza Carabobo in Caracas. Curiously, he is sometimes depicted wearing a turban, the same iconography used for the mythical Negro Felipe. With the declaration of independence in 1810, all trafficking in slaves was outlawed. The decline in slavery continued throughout the War of Independence when, at its conclusion in 1821, the "Ley de vientre" was passed, stating that all children born, whether of slave or free parents, were automatically free. By 24 March 1854, the date of slavery's official abolition in Venezuela, less than 24,000 slaves remained.

Aftermath of slavery and based discrimination of the 20th century 
Throughout the twentieth century, Blacks in Venezuela have faced subtle forms of racial discrimination despite a philosophy of racial democracy and an ideology of mestizaje that contends all groups have blended together to form a new, indistinguishable type, called the mestizo. Yet underlying this ideology is a policy of blanqueamiento, or "whitening", that has encouraged both the physical and cultural assimilation of Afro-Venezuelans into a Euro-dominated mainstream. An important semantic counterpart to the process of blanqueamiento is that found in the term negrear, which denotes concepts of "marginalization" or "trivialization". The emergence of Black intellectuals such as Juan Pablo Sojo and Manuel Rodrigues Cárdenas in the 1940s, and more recently of younger writers such as Jesús García, has helped counter the forces of blanqueamiento, or assimilation. A strong body of research in Afro-Venezuelan history and folklore has also been established by Venezuelan scholars, particularly Miguel Acosta Saignes (1967). Public festivals such as the Fiesta de San Juan have emerged as focal points in the reappropriation of Afro-Venezuelan culture, articulating current transformations in a living tradition of cimarronaje (resistance to the dominant culture, consciousness of being marginal).

Cultural expression

Religion 
Afro-Venezuelan religious practices have been adapted to Catholicism. Drumming and dancing, which figure in the celebrations of patron saints' days and other religious ceremonies, bear a close resemblance to various forms of African ancestor worship. Because the slave population was so heterogeneous, no single African religious system dominated in this syncretization process, as it did for example in Cuba, Brazil, and, to a lesser extent, in Trinidad with its Yoruba tradition. There has also been some intersection with indigenous cosmological systems. It is through contact with these beings, usually dwelling in deep riverine pools, that  (healers) derive their power and divine the future. These beings are also responsible for the deaths and disappearance of various people. Such beliefs are articulated in the oral traditions not only of Afro-Venezuelans but of indigenous and mestizo peoples as well.

Some Afro-Venezuelans practice the African Diasporic religions of Venezuelan Yuyu and Espiritismo. Espiritismo originated in the 14th century from Rural tribes of the Carib People of Yaracuy, in Central Venezuela. This religion has spread across Venezuela and even to Colombia, Brazil, Cuba, Dominican Republic, and Puerto Rico. It Revolves around an indigenous goddess originally called Yara, but when the Spanish came, she became Santa Maria de La Onza (Saint Mary of the Jaguar) She is said to reside in the Cerro María Lionza Natural Monument,
also known as Mount Sorte, near Chivacoa, Yaracuy. The religion involves possessions, drumming, healing ceremonies, and others. Venezuelan Yuyu is an Afro-Diasporic religion from Venezuela that originates from West African Vodun, Yoruba Isese and Kongo religion. The original religion is still practiced by some rural communities on the Caribbean coast of Central and Western Venezuela but it has been mostly lost due to outside influence. The religion was first practiced when African slaves from the Ewe, Fon, Igbo, Yoruba, Gbe, Efik, Akan, Kongo, and Mbundu tribes came to Venezuela and incorporated Indigenous animism, European Catholicism and Spirituality, as well as African animism, trance possession, and communication with the dead and spirits

The influx of Cuban immigrants after the Cuban Revolution in 1959 has encouraged the establishment of the Afro-Cuban religion Santería among Venezuelans of all cultural and socioeconomic backgrounds. Although this is a predominantly urban phenomenon, African influences in Venezuela continue to evolve through a dynamic and continuous migration of cultural practices and forms.

Religious practitioners 
Organized as they were around patron saints, Black cofradías were not simply social organizations, but also religious ones. Some cofradías were subdivided into separate "societies" that had distinct responsibilities. Sojo (1986) reports that in Barlovento, for example, each day of Holy Week had a separate society that was in charge of maintaining the holy images and ritual ceremonies associated with the respective day. In preparation, members would practice celibacy, abstain from consumption of alcohol, and perform various ablutions before "dressing" the saintly image.

Since colonial times, magico-religious societies have also existed, employing various forms of brujería, or "witchcraft". In Afro-Venezuelan communities, as in the rest of Venezuela, there is belief in brujos (sorcerers), who can cast spells and cause various forms of daño (harm). Fear of mal de ojo ("evil eye") against children is particularly common. Curanderas are sought for their knowledge of herbal medicines, which are used both in combatting illness and counteracting daño. In Barlovento, healers are sometimes called ensalmadores and are particularly respected for their ability to divine the future as well as to find lost objects and people.

Arts and ceremonies 
Afro-Venezuelan ceremonies have been primarily linked to the Christian calendar, and many Afro-Venezuelan music, dance, and costume traditions are associated with specific church celebrations. The Nativity, Holy Week, Corpus Christi, the Cruz de Mayo, and patron saints' holidays are central to Afro-Venezuelan expressive culture throughout the country. The Día de los  (Feast of Fools, 28 December) is also celebrated and is particularly important in Barlovento, where "governments of women" are set up parodying male authority with absurd decrees and other actions such as cross-dressing. Carnival celebrations (the week before Lent) are significant, especially in eastern Venezuela, where in communities such as Güiria and El Callao there has been a large Caribbean influence. During saints' feast days, promesas (promises) made to the saints in return for personal favors are fulfilled. Correct observance of ritual activities such as offerings, drumming, dancing, and the feeding of all those present are essential to satisfying these promises.

In various regions of Venezuela, different religious holidays have emerged as important local celebrations. Around Lake Maracaibo, the fiesta of a Black saint San Benito (26 December to 2 January) is prominent and is celebrated with the playing of chimbánguele drums. In Cata, Chuao, Cuyagua, and Ocumare de la Costa (Aragua), Naiguatá (Distrito Federal), San Francisco de Yare (Miranda), and Canoabo and Patanemo (Carabobo), the Diablos Danzantes (organized into cofradías) are the centerpiece of the Corpus Christi celebrations, performing in particularly vivid costumes and masks that incorporate African imagery. In Barlovento, the Fiesta of San Juan Bautista (Saint John the Baptist) has been of singular importance since slavery. The three days of San Juan (23 to 25 June) were the only three days of the year during which slaves were given a rest from hard labor and were permitted to gather freely. During the holiday, not only would slaves celebrate with drumming and dancing, but also plot insurrection and flight.

Music 
Afro-Venezuelan musical expression is characterized by a great diversity of drums. Most are of African origin and many bear direct resemblance to the drums of Bantu-speaking and West African groups. Generally, drums use specific rhythmic patterns to accompany specific song or dance forms; hence, drums, rhythms, and stylistic forms may all be designated by the same name. In turn, this stylistic complex is usually associated  with a specific fiesta or celebration.

In Barlovento, the culo e'puya drums are important, as are the mina and curbata, which are played together. Quitiplas  are also prominent in Barlovento. These are fashioned from hollow   bamboo tubes and played by striking them on the ground. (They are similar to the Trinidadian "tambou bamboo" that gave rise to steel-drum styles.) Along the central coastal region, the cumaco is widespread, used in San Juan celebrations as well as the secular bailes de tambor (dances). The tamunango is found in Afro-Venezuelan communities in the interior. In the eastern coastal regions, influence from Trinidad is evident in the performance of steel-band music. Maracas (seed-filled rattles) are prevalent throughout Venezuela and are commonly used to accompany drumming, as is another indigenous-derived instrument, the conch.

Other small percussion instruments, such as the charrasca,  a small notched scraper, are also used as accompaniment. As in other parts of Venezuela, the four-stringed cuatro is extremely common.

Folklore 
In addition to musical, dance, and costume traditions, oral lore forms an essential part of Afro-Venezuelan expressive culture. Some of the best-known tales in Afro-Venezuelan oratory center around the exploits of Tío Conejo (Uncle Rabbit), who manages to outwit Tío Tigre (Uncle Tiger). In the twentieth century a small body of Afro-Venezuelan literature has been established, including the works of novelist and folklorist Juan Pablo Sojo and the poet Manuel Rodrigues Cárdenas. Theater and dance groups, which have a long history of performance in Barlovento, have become progressively more important with the appearance of such groups as the Centro de Creación Teatral  de Barlovento-Curiepe, the Teatro Negro de Barlovento, and Madera.

Afro-Venezuelans today

Identification 
Afro-Venezuelans are designated by Spanish terms; no words of African derivation are used. "Afro-venezolano" is used primarily as an adjective (e.g., folklore afro-venezolano). "Negro" is the most general term of reference; "Moreno" refers to darker-skinned people, and "Mulatto" refers to lighter-skinned people, usually of mixed European-African heritage. "Pardo" was used in colonial times to refer to freed slaves, or those of mixed Euro-African-Indigenous background. "Zambo" referred to those of mixed Afro-indigenous background. "Criollo", which retains its colonial meaning of "being born in Venezuela", does not indicate any racial or ethnic affiliation.

Location 
Afro-Venezuelans can be found all over the country, but the largest Afro-Venezuelan population is located in the Barlovento region, in the state of Miranda. Comprising an area of 4,500 square kilometers, Barlovento covers four districts of the state of Miranda. There are also important Afro-Venezuelan communities along the coasts of Carabobo (Canoabo, Patanemo, Puerto Cabello), the Distrito Federal (Naiguatá, La Sabana, Tarma, etc.), Aragua (Cata, Chuao, Cuyagua, Ocumare de la Costa, etc.), and the southeast shore of Lake Maracaibo (Bobures, Gibraltar, Santa María, etc.). Smaller pockets are also found in Sucre (Campoma, Güiria), the southwest area of Yaracuy (Farriar), and the mountains of Miranda (Yare). An important Afro-Venezuelan community is also to be found in El Callao, in the southernmost state of Bolivar, where miners from both the French and British Antilles settled in the mid-nineteenth century.

Demography 

In the 2011 census, 3.6% of Venezuelans self-identified as Afro-Venezuelan. Perceptions of race are specific to Venezuela: for example, Barack Obama is considered black in United States, but in Venezuela, he would be considered moreno. Similar to Brazil, in Venezuela, people tend to be categorized by how they look: "moreno", "negro", "bachaco", etc. rather than by their actual ancestry. Encyclopædia Britannica estimates that at least one-tenth of Venezuelans (3 million) have relatively pure Sub-Saharan African ancestry.   The Brilliant Maps calculates that Afro-descendants comprise 4% of the Venezuelan population. However, most Venezuelans are mixed with African ancestry, and Afro-Venezuelan culture is acknowledged as a vital component of national identity.

Notable Afro-Venezuelans 

 
 Carlos suarez
 Cristian Cásseres
 Cristian Cásseres Jr.
 Christian Makoun
 Edson Castillo
 Josef Martinez
Ronald Acuna Jr. – professional baseball player for the Atlanta Braves 
 Damaso Blanco – professional baseball player for the San Francisco Giants
Pedro Camejo – Venezuelan soldier who fought with the royal army 
Hugo Chávez – politician, former president of Venezuela (1999–2013)
Aristóbulo Istúriz – Venezuelan politician
Argelia Laya – educator, political activist, philosopher, co-founder and president of the political party MAS (Movimiento al Socialismo)
Susan Carrizo – Miss World Venezuela 2005
Oscar D'León – musician
Carolina Indriago – Miss Venezuela 1998
Morella Muñoz – musician, singer
Allan Phillips – music producer
Magdalena Sánchez – singer
Mariah Carey – singer, father is African-American and Venezuelan and mother is of Irish descent.
Pablo Sandoval – professional baseball third baseman for the Boston Red Sox
Bobby Abreu – professional baseball for the New York Mets
Ainett Stephens – television personality and model
Jictzad Viña – Miss Venezuela titleholder for 2005
Elvis Andrus – professional baseball shortstop for the Texas Rangers
Franklin Virgüez – actor
Gledys Ibarra – actress
Salvador Pérez – professional baseball player 
Carl Herrera – professional basketball player
Odubel Herrera – professional baseball player
Wuilker Faríñez – goalkeeper for the Venezuela national football team
Yulimar Rojas – track & field athlete
Rodrigo Riera – guitarist and composer
Jose Acevedo – track and field athlete
Esther Pineda G – sociologist and feminist writer
Ciclón Negro – wrestler
Omar Atlas – wrestler
 Jose
 Jhon Murillo
 Salomón Rondón
 Darwin Machís
 Jan Carlos Hurtado
 Luis Gonzalez
 Yangel Herrera
 Gelmin Rivas
 Renny Vega
 Eduard Bello
 Roberto Rosales
 Rómulo Otero
Sergio Córdova
 Victor Garcia
 Yonathan Del Valle

References 

 
Venezuelan
Ethnic groups in Venezuela